Roues libres (Germany: Nachtfahrt), is a 2002 Ivorian crime drama film directed by Sidiki Bakaba and co-produced by Ayala Bakaba and Berti Dichi. The film stars Adama Dahico, Placide Bayoro, Daouda Traoré and Michel Gohou in main roles.

It was filmed entirety in Abidjan, Côte D'Ivoire. The film received critical acclaim and won several awards at international film festivals including Best director at l’Association des Professionnels du cinéma de Côte d'Ivoire.

Cast
 Adama Dahico as Fofana
 Placide Bayoro as Guélé
 Daouda Traoré as Patcheco
 Sidiki Bakaba as Commissaire Blazo
 Michel Gohou as Amara
 Alomo Ignace Konan as Sergent Kra
 Corinne Haccandy as Ema Amara
 Maho Monké as Pablo

References

External links
 

2002 films
Ivorian drama films
2002 crime drama films